Mitchell David Trubisky (born August 20, 1994) is an American football quarterback for the Pittsburgh Steelers of the National Football League (NFL). He played college football at North Carolina and was drafted second overall by the Chicago Bears in the 2017 NFL Draft. 

Trubisky saw some early success with the Bears, leading the team to a NFC North division title in his second season while being selected to the Pro Bowl. He left the team via free agency in 2021, and signed with the Buffalo Bills as a backup to Josh Allen. Trubisky joined the Steelers as a free agent in 2022 and started the team's first four games before being benched for Kenny Pickett.

Early life
Trubisky was born in Mentor, Ohio, on August 20, 1994. He attended Mentor High School where he played for the Cardinals football team. During his high school football career, he passed for 9,126 yards and 92 touchdowns and rushed for 1,559 career yards and 33 touchdowns. He was the recipient of the Ohio Mr. Football Award in 2012. Trubisky committed to the University of North Carolina at Chapel Hill to play college football under head coach Larry Fedora.

College career
Trubisky redshirted for his first year at North Carolina in 2013. He played in ten games as a backup to starter Marquise Williams in 2014. He made his collegiate debut in relief of Williams against the Liberty Flames in a 56–29 victory. In the game, he was 10-of-16 for 66 yards with one touchdown and one interception. He threw his first career touchdown to tight end Jack Tabb in the third quarter. 

Trubisky appeared in North Carolina's bowl game at the end of the season against the Rutgers Scarlet Knights. In the 2014 Quick Lane Bowl, he was 7-of-9 for 65 yards and a touchdown, which was a pass to receiver Kendrick Singleton, in the 40–21 loss to the Scarlet Knights. For his freshman season he completed 42-of-78 passes for 459 yards, five touchdowns, and four interceptions.

As a sophomore, Trubisky again served as the backup to Williams, appearing in nine games in the 2015 season. He made his season debut against the North Carolina A&T Aggies. In the game, he was 5-of-7 for 37 yards and a touchdown. In addition, he had a 35-yard rushing touchdown in the 53–14 victory. He had a career day against the Delaware Fightin' Blue Hens on September 26. He was 17-of-20 for 312 yards and four touchdowns in the 41–14 victory. He made an appearance in the ACC Championship Game against the Clemson Tigers, completing a single pass for 16 yards. For the season, he completed 40-of-47 passes for 555 yards and six touchdowns and rushed 16 times for 101 yards and three touchdowns.

As a junior, Trubisky took over as the starting quarterback in 2016. He started in all 13 games in the 2016 season. In the season-opening 33–24 loss to the Georgia Bulldogs, he was 24-of-40 for 156 yards. He added three rushes for seven yards and one touchdown. In the following week against the Illinois Fighting Illini, he had 265 passing yards and two touchdowns. In addition, he had nine rushes for 42 yards and two rushing touchdowns in the 48–23 victory. Two weeks later against the Pittsburgh Panthers, he had a career-day through the air. He was 35-of-46 for 453 yards and five touchdowns in the 37–36 victory. On November 5, against the Georgia Tech Yellow Jackets, he had his first career reception, which was for eight yards. In the 2016 Sun Bowl against the Stanford Cardinal, he was 23-of-39 for 280 yards, two touchdowns, and two interceptions in his final collegiate game, a 25–23 loss. He recorded 3,748 passing yards with 30 touchdowns and six interceptions in his junior season. As a result of his successful junior season, he was named a member of the third-team All-ACC. Trubisky decided to forgo his senior season and declared for the 2017 NFL Draft on January 9, 2017, opting to give up his final year of college eligibility.

College statistics

Professional career
Coming out of college, Trubisky was projected to be a first-round pick by the majority of scouts and analysts.
ESPN and Pro Football Focus ranked Trubisky the second best quarterback, NFLDraftScout.com ranked him as the top quarterback in the draft, and Sports Illustrated ranked him the fourth best quarterback available.

Chicago Bears
Trubisky was drafted by the Chicago Bears in the first round with the second overall pick in the 2017 NFL Draft. He was the highest-selected quarterback in the draft. The Bears moved up from the third overall pick by trading the San Francisco 49ers two third-round picks and a fourth-round pick.

2017 season

During the 2017 preseason, Trubisky recorded the third-highest passer rating of the 29 quarterbacks with at least 50 passes with 106.2, along with three touchdowns and no interceptions. Despite his strong preseason, he was named the backup to Mike Glennon for the 2017 regular season.

After the Bears started the season with a 1–3 record, head coach John Fox benched Glennon and Trubisky was named the starter for Week 5. Trubisky made his first regular season start on October 9, 2017, against the Minnesota Vikings, where he completed 12-of-25 passes for 128 yards, a touchdown, and an interception, as the Bears lost 20–17 on Monday Night Football. His first career touchdown was a 20-yard pass to tight end Zach Miller. In his next start, he completed 8-of-16 passes, including a touchdown and a critical completion in overtime that set up a game-winning field goal in a 27–24 win over the Baltimore Ravens. During Week 7 against the Carolina Panthers, Trubisky was limited to 107 passing yards, but with the defense forcing three turnovers and two defensive touchdowns, the Bears won by a score of 17–3.

In Week 12, Trubisky completed 17 for 33 passes for 147 yards and two interceptions en route to a 31–3 loss against the Philadelphia Eagles. The following week, Trubisky completed 12-of-15 passes for 102 yards and a touchdown against the San Francisco 49ers, but a late field goal by Robbie Gould lifted the 49ers to a 15–14 victory. During Week 14, however, he completed 25-of-32 passes for 271 yards and a touchdown to seal a 33–7 blowout win over the Cincinnati Bengals, snapping a five-game losing streak as well as posting a 112.4 passer rating. In Week 15, he struggled against the Detroit Lions; despite finishing with 314 passing yards and a touchdown, he also threw three interceptions as the Bears lost 20–10. In the next game, a 20–3 victory over the Cleveland Browns, Trubisky threw for 193 yards; increasing his season passing yard total to 2,015, the most by a rookie in Bears history. In the regular season finale, a 23–10 loss to the Minnesota Vikings, he had 178 passing yards and no interceptions.

Trubisky ended his rookie season with a 4–8 record in 12 starts, seven touchdown passes, and seven interceptions. He also ran for 248 yards, the most by a Bears quarterback since Kordell Stewart in 2003.

2018 season

Fox was fired after the 2017 season and was replaced by Kansas City Chiefs offensive coordinator Matt Nagy, who expressed an interest in working with Trubisky after the two met prior to the 2017 draft. General manager Ryan Pace made it an off-season priority to build the Bears' offense around Trubisky, the team signed wide receivers Allen Robinson and Taylor Gabriel and tight end Trey Burton over the 2018 off-season. Despite Trubisky having a slow start to the 2018 regular season in which he threw just two touchdown passes in the first three games, the Bears managed a 2–1 start through the first three weeks.

Success came in week 4 against the Tampa Bay Buccaneers: he completed 19-of-26 passes for 354 yards, threw for six touchdowns (five in the first half), and got a passer rating of 154.7. Chicago won by a score of 48–10; the six touchdowns were one short of the Bears franchise record set by Sid Luckman in 1943. Trubisky became the first Bears quarterback to throw five touchdowns in a half since Johnny Lujack in 1949, and he was the second player in NFL history to have five different players catch a touchdown pass in a game since Aaron Rodgers of the 2014 Green Bay Packers against the Bears. He was named the FedEx Air Player of the Week for his performance.

After a Week 5 bye, in Week 6 against the Miami Dolphins, Trubisky threw for 316 yards, three touchdowns, and one interception in the 31–28 overtime loss. In Week 7, in a loss to the New England Patriots that saw his potential game-tying Hail Mary pass to Kevin White be caught one yard short of the end zone, Trubisky threw for 333 yards, two touchdowns, and two interceptions, while also rushing for 81 yards and a touchdown. On the touchdown run, from the Patriots' eight-yard line, he faced pressure that forced him to retreat horizontally across the field before running forward for the score; while it is officially an eight-yard touchdown run, he ran a distance of 71.91 yards on the play. The following week, he hit Tarik Cohen for a 70-yard touchdown in the first quarter, ending the day with 220 yards in the win over the New York Jets. In Week 9, against the Buffalo Bills, his output was low but the Bears victory was assisted with four takeaways and two defensive touchdowns. In Week 10 against the Detroit Lions, Trubisky threw for 355 yards and three touchdowns, and rushed for 18 yards and a touchdown, in their 34–22 victory against the division rival. His performance again earned him NFC Offensive Player of the Week.

In a victory over the Minnesota Vikings during Week 11, Trubisky threw a touchdown and two interceptions for 165 yards, but suffered a shoulder injury delivered by Vikings' safety Harrison Smith on a late hit, which caused him to miss the Bears' next two games. Trubisky made his return in Week 14 against the Los Angeles Rams and threw for 110 yards, one touchdown, and three interceptions. His touchdown pass was a two-yard pass to offensive lineman Bradley Sowell. Despite his struggles, the Bears defense made four interceptions off Rams quarterback Jared Goff and won by a score of 15–6. In Week 15, Trubisky threw for 235 yards and two touchdowns in a 24–17 win over the Green Bay Packers. The win also clinched the NFC North division for the Bears for the first time since 2010.

In December, Trubisky was named an alternate to the 2019 Pro Bowl. During the Week 16 win over the San Francisco 49ers, Trubisky completed 25 of 29 passes for 246 yards and a touchdown for a completion percentage of 86.2, the highest by a Bears quarterback with at least 20 passes since 1950. He also became the sixth quarterback in Bears history to record 3,000 passing yards in a season. After 163 yards in the season finale victory over the Minnesota Vikings, he ended the regular season with 3,223 passing yards, 24 touchdowns, and 12 interceptions; he also rushed for 421 yards (fifth among quarterbacks) and three touchdowns. He tied the team record for most 300-passing-yard games in a season with four, while also setting a franchise-high of games with a passer rating higher than 120 as he had four.
He received an overall grade of 63.6 from Pro Football Focus in 2018, which ranked as the 33rd highest grade among all qualifying quarterbacks.

In the Wild Card Round against the Philadelphia Eagles, Trubisky rebounded from nearly throwing two interceptions in the second quarter to completing 13 of 20 passes for 198 yards and a touchdown to Robinson in the second half. On the Bears' final drive of the game, with 48 seconds remaining and his team trailing 16–15, Trubisky led a 33-yard drive that featured a 25-yard pass to Robinson. However, Cody Parkey's potential 43-yard game-winning field goal failed – off the post and then crossbar – and resulted in a Chicago defeat. Trubisky ended his playoff debut having completed 26 of 43 passes for 303 yards, one touchdown, and a passer rating of 89.6; the yards and completions set franchise postseason records, while Trubisky became the youngest Bears quarterback to throw a touchdown pass in the playoffs since Doug Flutie in 1986.

On January 21, 2019, he was officially declared a Pro Bowl participant in place of the Super Bowl-bound Jared Goff. He became the first Bears quarterback since Jim McMahon in 1986 to be named to the Pro Bowl.

2019 season

In Week 1 against the Green Bay Packers, Trubisky threw for 228 yards for zero touchdowns and one interception. He finished the game completing 26 out of 45 pass attempts with a quarterback rating of 62.1 as the Bears lost 10–3. The following week against the Denver Broncos, Trubisky threw 16 times for 120 yards, including a 25-yard completion on fourth down to wide receiver Allen Robinson with only eight seconds in the game that set up a 53-yard game-winning field goal by kicker Eddy Piñeiro. In Week 3 against the Washington Redskins, Trubisky recorded his first touchdown pass of the year on a three-yard throw to Taylor Gabriel; the pair recorded two more touchdowns during the second quarter. Trubisky ended the 31–15 Bears victory with 231 passing yards, three touchdowns, and one interception as the Bears won 31–15. In Week 4 against the Minnesota Vikings, Trubisky injured his shoulder after being tackled by Danielle Hunter in the first quarter.  He was relieved by Chase Daniel who led the Bears to a 16–6 win. On October 20, the Bears ruled Trubisky active ahead of their game against the New Orleans Saints. In the game, Trubisky threw for 251 yards and two touchdowns in the 36–25 loss.

In Week 9 against the Philadelphia Eagles, Trubisky threw for 125 yards in the 22–14 loss. The Bears' offense generated nine total yards in the first half as the team suffered their fourth consecutive loss, which led to continued talk about Trubisky's hold on the Bears' quarterback position both in the short and long term. In Week 10 against the Detroit Lions, Trubisky threw for 173 yards and three touchdowns in the 20–13 win. In Week 11 against the Los Angeles Rams on Sunday Night Football, Trubisky threw for 190 yards, one touchdown, and one interception. He suffered a hip pointer while being sacked by Michael Brockers and was benched late in the fourth quarter for Daniel in the 17–7 loss.

Trubisky played his first Thanksgiving career game in Week 13 against the Detroit Lions; in the game, he threw for 338 yards, three touchdowns including the game-winning score, and an interception in the 24–20 win. He was subsequently named FedEx Air Player of the Week. The following week against Dallas Cowboys, Trubisky rebounded from throwing an opening-drive interception at the Cowboys' one-yard line by recording 244 passing yards, three touchdown passes, and 63 rushing yards, including a 23-yard rushing touchdown on a read option play as the Bears won 31–24. In Week 15, against the Green Bay Packers, he passed for 334 yards, one touchdown, and two interceptions in the 21–13 loss. This loss, coupled with a Vikings' victory over the Los Angeles Chargers, eliminated the Bears from playoff contention. Overall, in the 2019 season, Trubisky recorded 3,138 passing yards, 17 passing touchdowns, and ten interceptions to go along with 48 carries for 193 rushing yards and two rushing touchdowns.

2020 season

On March 31, 2020, the Bears traded for Jacksonville Jaguars quarterback Nick Foles and announced an "open competition" for starting quarterback between Trubisky and Foles. On May 2, the Bears declined Trubisky's fifth-year option. Trubisky and Foles battled for the starting position during the offseason, and Nagy named Trubisky the starter prior to the 2020 season opener.

In the season opener against the Detroit Lions, Trubisky started off slow as he completed eight passes on 20 attempts for 110 yards in the first half, while the Bears trailed 23–6 entering the fourth quarter. During the final period, he saw marked improvement with eight of ten passes completed for 89 yards and three touchdowns, scoring 21 unanswered points as the Bears came back for the 27–23 victory. Trubisky attributed the late-game success to the Lions' switch to man-to-man defense, explaining in his press conference that "when [the Lions] got down to the wire, they're going to play what they trust most and that's man for them. And we knew that."

The following week against the New York Giants, Trubisky completed 13 of 18 passes for 159 yards and a pair of touchdowns in the first half as the Bears pulled ahead 17–0. However, he had just five of ten completions for 31 yards and two interceptions in the second, with the Giants nearly coming back before Chicago held on for the 17–13 victory.

The Bears benched Trubisky during the Week 3 game against the Atlanta Falcons after falling into a 16-point deficit. Foles replaced Trubisky and led the Bears to a 30–26 comeback victory. Trubisky completed 13 of 22 passes for 128 yards, one touchdown, and one interception prior to being benched. Foles was officially named the starter a day after the game.

Trubisky briefly saw action in Week 8 against the New Orleans Saints as a Wildcat formation quarterback, recording a three-yard run on a drive that ended with a field goal. The idea to integrate Trubisky for such plays began development shortly after his benching, with Nagy explaining in his post-game conference that it was "a weapon for us to be able to use his legs, then obviously be able to throw the ball, as well. That's something that we're looking at. Every game could be a little bit different, but it's something that teams have to prepare for." However, he suffered an injury to his throwing shoulder on the play, deactivating him for the following week's game.

On November 27, the Bears announced Trubisky as the starter for their Week 12 game against the Green Bay Packers on Sunday Night Football due to Foles dealing with a hip injury. During the game, he completed 26-of-46 passes for 242 yards, three touchdowns and two interceptions, while also losing a fumble that was returned for a touchdown in the 41–25 loss. Trubisky completed 26 of 34 passes for 267 yards and one touchdown in the following game against Detroit, but he lost a fumble within his team's ten-yard line with less than two minutes remaining, leading to the Lions' game-winning touchdown.

The Week 14 game against the Houston Texans was preceded by media coverage focusing on Trubisky's selection in the 2017 draft ahead of eventual Texans quarterback Deshaun Watson; an ESPN.com article published during the week was headlined, "Bears fans will watch Texans' Deshaun Watson outplay Mitchell Trubisky and wonder what could have been". Trubisky went 24 of 33 for 267 yards, three touchdowns, and a season-best 126.7 passer rating to help the Bears lead 30–7 at halftime and win 36–7.
In Week 16 against the Jacksonville Jaguars, Trubisky threw for 265 yards, two touchdowns, and one interception and rushed for another touchdown during the 41–17 win. Overall, Trubisky appeared in ten games in the 2020 season. He finished with 2,055 passing yards, 16 touchdowns, and eight interceptions.

During the Wild Card Round of the 2020–21 NFL playoffs, Trubisky completed 19 of 29 passes for 199 yards and one touchdown as the New Orleans Saints defeated the Bears 21–9. Despite the defeat, Trubisky won the online voting for the NVP, or Nickelodeon Valuable Player, which was the target of an online ballot stuffing campaign during the game's broadcast on Nickelodeon.

Trubisky accrued 10,609 passing yards, 64 touchdowns and 37 interceptions during his four seasons with the Bears. He holds the Bears franchise record for career passer rating (87.2) and career completion percentage (64%). During his tenure with the Bears, Trubisky was considered by some to be a draft bust due to both inconsistent play and the success of those drafted after him such as Patrick Mahomes and Deshaun Watson.

Buffalo Bills

On March 18, 2021, Trubisky signed a one-year deal with the Buffalo Bills worth $2.5 million. He was not offered a starting opportunity with other teams, so Trubisky said he signed with the Bills to be Josh Allen's back-up and learn under the same coaching staff that developed Allen into an MVP candidate.

Trubisky made his first appearance for the Bills late in a blowout victory over Washington Football Team in Week 3. He made another appearance in the 4th quarter in a 40–0 victory over the Houston Texans in Week 4, where he scored his only touchdown of the season, a four-yard run.

Pittsburgh Steelers

On March 17, 2022, Trubisky signed a two-year contract with the Pittsburgh Steelers. On September 6, 2022, Trubisky was named the starting quarterback for the Steelers Week 1 game against the Cincinnati Bengals. In the game, Trubisky threw for 194 yards and a touchdown and committed no turnovers in the 23–20 overtime win. After throwing for 168 yards with a touchdown and an interception in the Week 2 loss at home against the New England Patriots, there were chants of "We Want Kenny" heard amongst the Steelers crowd. In Week 4 against the New York Jets, Trubisky was benched going in the third quarter for Kenny Pickett after throwing for 84 yards and an interception in the 24-20 loss. Later that week, Tomlin announced Pickett the starting quarterback. During a week 6 game against the Tampa Bay Buccaneers, Trubisky came in to replace an injured Kenny Pickett.

NFL career statistics

Regular season

Postseason

Records and achievements

Chicago Bears records

Holds Chicago Bears postseason single-game yardage record with 303 yards (previously held by Sid Luckman)
Holds Bears franchise rookie records for completions (196) and passing yards (2,193)
Fastest Bears QB to eclipse 10,000 career passing yards, 49 games (previously held by Jim McMahon)

Personal life
Trubisky earned the nickname "Mr. Biscuit" in college, after one of his coaches had trouble pronouncing his name. His younger brothers Manning and Mason played wide receiver at Mentor High School, with the former going on to play at John Carroll University.

Trubisky married Hillary Gallagher on July 3, 2021. Their son was born in May 2022.

References

External links

 Pittsburgh Steelers bio
 North Carolina Tar Heels bio

1994 births
Living people
American football quarterbacks
Buffalo Bills players
Chicago Bears players
Mentor High School alumni
National Conference Pro Bowl players
North Carolina Tar Heels football players
People from Mentor, Ohio
Pittsburgh Steelers players
Players of American football from Ohio
Sportspeople from Greater Cleveland